VoTT (Visual Object Tagging Tool) is a free and open source electron app for  image annotation and labeling developed by Microsoft. The software is written in the TypeScript programming language and used for building end to end object detection models from image and videos assets for computer vision algorithms.

Overview
VoTT is a React+Redux web application that requires Node.js and npm. It is available as a stand-alone web application and can be used in any modern web browser.

Notable features include the ability to label images or video frames, support for importing data from local or cloud storage providers, and support for exporting labeled data to local or cloud storage providers.

Labeled assets can be exported into the following formats:
 Comma-separated values (CSV)
 Microsoft Azure Custom Vision Service
 Microsoft Cognitive Toolkit (CNTK)
 TensorFlow (Pascal VOC and TFRecords)
 VoTT (generic JSON schema)

The VoTT source code is licensed under MIT License and available on GitHub.

See also

 List of manual image annotation tools
 Computer Vision Annotation Tool
 LabelMe
 Supervised learning
 Image segmentation

References

External links
Visual Object Tagging Tool (VoTT) v2.2.0

Computer vision software
Datasets in computer vision
Object recognition and categorization
Free and open-source software
Microsoft free software
Software using the MIT license
2018 software